Amrit Mangat (born ) is a former politician in Ontario, Canada. She was a Liberal member of the Legislative Assembly of Ontario from 2007 to 2018 who represented the riding of Mississauga—Brampton South.

Background
Mangat was born in Jagroan, India. Her parents were originally from West Punjab but were forced to emigrate during the Partition of India in 1947. Mangat studied in India and obtained degrees in political science, economics, English and education. After immigrating to Canada in 1992 she obtained her Ontario College of Teachers certification. In addition to teaching, Mangat managed several small businesses. She most recently worked as an administrator in a law firm, helping new Canadians to settle.

She lives with her husband Jaswant who works as a lawyer.

Politics
In 2004 she tried to get nominated in the federal riding of Brampton West but lost to Colleen Beaumier. In the 2007 provincial election she ran as the Liberal candidate in the riding of Mississauga—Brampton South. During the campaign she came out in support of keeping Peel Memorial Hospital open and she spoke against the Conservative promise to fund private faith-based schools. She defeated Progressive Conservative candidate Ravi Singh by 10,405 votes. She was re-elected in 2011 and 2014.

During her time in government she was appointed as Parliamentary assistant to a number of roles including Seniors and transportation.

As of 2014, she serves as a Parliamentary Assistant to the Minister of the Environment and Climate Change.

In the 2018 Provincial Election, she stood in the new riding of Mississauga—Malton and placed third.

Electoral record

References

External links

1953 births
21st-century Canadian politicians
21st-century Canadian women politicians
Canadian politicians of Indian descent
Indian emigrants to Canada
Living people
Ontario Liberal Party MPPs
Politicians from Mississauga
Women MPPs in Ontario